6′-Guanidinonaltrindole (6′-GNTI) is a κ–δ-opioid receptor selective ligand used in scientific research.

With 6′-GNTI, evidence was provided for the first time that receptor oligomerization plays functional role in living organisms.

6′-GNTI is an extremely biased agonist of the κ-opioid receptor. It is a potent partial agonist of the G protein pathway but does not recruit the β-arrestin pathway. Due to its functional selectivity for the G protein pathway, 6′-GNTI functions as an antagonist of nonbiased KOR agonists on the β-arrestin pathway. It is thought that 6′-GTNI may be able to produce analgesia without dysphoria and with a lower incidence of tolerance.

See also
 5′-Guanidinonaltrindole
 RB-64
 Noribogaine
 ICI-199,441

References

Semisynthetic opioids
Guanidines
Indolomorphinans
Kappa-opioid receptor agonists
Kappa-opioid receptor antagonists
Receptor heteromer ligands
Biased ligands